The Reval German Theater (German: Revaler Deutsches Theater) was the second theater building and the first professional theater in the city of Tallinn (then Reval) in Estonia, founded in 1795 and closed in 1939. It was named (German) Revaler Theater or (Estonian) Tallinna Teater in 1809-1860, (Estonian) Tallinna Linnateater or (German) Revaler Stadttheater in 1860-1910, and Tallinna saksa teater in 1910-1939. Its  building is now used by the Estonian Drama Theatre.

The theater was built to replace the first theater in Tallinn, the Revaler Liebhaber Theater (1784-1792). It was used by the German language amateur dramatic society, which was founded in 1784 and performed German language drama and opera under August von Kotzebue. In 1809 it was made a professional theater with professional German language actors, which made it the first professional theater in Tallinn. 

In 1939, the theater was closed and moved to occupied Poland by the order of the German national socialist government.

References

19th-century establishments in Estonia
History of Tallinn
Theatres in Tallinn